Streptomyces cangkringensis is a bacterium species from the genus of Streptomyces which has been isolated from rhizosphere soil from the plant Falcataria moluccana (= Paraserianthes falcataria) from Yogyakarta from the island Java in Indonesia.

See also 
 List of Streptomyces species

References

Further reading

External links
Type strain of Streptomyces cangkringensis at BacDive – the Bacterial Diversity Metadatabase

cangkringensis
Bacteria described in 2001